Betty, Bette, Bettye, Eliza or Elizabeth Davis may refer to:

Performers
Bette Davis (1908–1989), American actress
Betty Davis (1944–2022), American funk, rock and soul singer
Elizabeth Davis (bassist) (born 1965), American songwriter and musician
Elizabeth A. Davis (born 1980), American actress and musician

Writers
Eliza Davis (1866–1931), English fashion writer and gossip columnist known as "Mrs Aria"
Eliza Davis (letter writer), Jewish English woman notable for her correspondence with the novelist Charles Dickens
Elizabeth Lindsay Davis (1885–1944), African-American teacher and activist
Elizabeth Gould Davis (1910–1974), American librarian and feminist writer
Elizabeth Davis (midwife), American author and women's health care specialist since 1977
Elizabeth Davis (TV writer), American producer during 2010s, a/k/a Elizabeth Davis Beall

Others
Elizabeth Davis (Mormon) (1791–1876), American Latter-Day Saint and wife of Joseph Smith
Elizabeth Peke Davis (1803–1860), Hawaiian high chiefess, a/k/a Betty Davis
Betty Davis (film editor), American film editor during 1920s
Bettye Davis (1938–2018), American politician, social worker, and nurse
Bette Davis Eyes, 1974 song by Donna Weiss and Jackie DeShannon

See also
Elizabeth Davies (disambiguation)
Lisa Davis (disambiguation)